Dionysius Andreas Freher (12 September 1649 – 5 December 1728) was a Christian mystical and alchemical writer, most famous for his extensive commentaries on Jacob Boehme. He was born in Germany but spent most of his life in London, England.

Works
The Paradoxical Emblems of Dionysius Andreas Freher, edited by Adam McLean.
Hermetic Behmenists: writings from Dionysius Andreas Freher and Francis Lee, edited by John Madziarczyk.

References

 Charles Musès (1951) Illumination on Jacob Boehme. The work of Dionysius Andreas Freher, King's Crown Press, New York

External links
 An Illustration of the Deep Principles of Jacob Behmen, the Teutonic Theosopher
 Freher's Process in the Philosophical Work

1649 births
1728 deaths
17th-century alchemists
17th-century Christian mystics
18th-century alchemists
18th-century Christian mystics
English alchemists
German alchemists
Protestant mystics